Benjamin Minturn Hartshorne (1826–1900) was a California businessman who immigrated during the California Gold Rush. He was involved in Sacramento River and Colorado River steamboats as well as maritime shipping.

Business in California
Born on May 7, 1826, at Highlands, New Jersey, Benjamin was the son of Robert Hartshorne. He moved to California in 1849 and became involved in the ferry business at the Yuma Crossing on the Colorado River with George Alonzo Johnson and other partners from San Francisco.

Seeing the opportunity in bringing supplies to the isolated post of Fort Yuma, Hartshorne and Johnson sold out to their other partners in the Yuma ferry and returned to San Francisco in 1852.  The two men then contracted to carry supplies up the Colorado in poled barges, but this endeavor failed due to the strong current and many sandbars in the river. After a steam tug, the 20 horsepower Uncle Sam was successfully used to ascend the river in 1853, Johnson formed the George A. Johnson & Company. Hartshorne was employed as a shipping agent in San Francisco and another partner Captain Alfred H. Wilcox, who was an experienced sea captain, was taken on for his experience in the hazards of the Colorado River Delta.

The company brought the disassembled side-wheel steamboat General Jesup to the Colorado River Delta and assembled it with a more powerful 70 hp engine. There Johnson began successfully shipping cargo and carrying passengers on the Colorado River from its estuary, up to Fort Yuma.  This steamboat carried 50 tons of cargo to the fort in 5 days and brought the cost to supply the fort down to $75 a ton from the $500 a ton it cost to ship cargo overland across the desert from San Diego. The route made the Company $4,000 per trip per ship in the estuary of the Colorado River.

As the only steamboat company on the Colorado River, Johnson and his partners became wealthy after the discovery of gold along the Colorado River in 1858. Hartshorne, who was president of the company operating the business from San Francisco, invested his new wealth in the California Steam Navigation Company, becoming its vice-president by 1863 and its president in 1865. In 1869, George A. Johnson & Company was incorporated with additional partners as the Colorado Steam Navigation Company with Hartshorne as its president. 
 That same year Hartshorne's wife, Julia Norton Hartshorne, who he had married in 1862 and with which he had 3 children, died at the age of 30.  Her body was sent back to be buried in the Hartshorne Family Cemetery.

Later life
After both his companies were bought out by the railroads, Hartshorne returned to the family estate in Monmouth County, New Jersey in 1878.  He died there in 1900.

References

American businesspeople in shipping
Businesspeople from the San Francisco Bay Area
1826 births
1900 deaths
People of the California Gold Rush
People from Highlands, New Jersey
Steamboat transport on the Colorado River
Hartshorne
Maritime history of California
19th-century American businesspeople
People in 19th-century California